George Augustus Ray (April 23, 1819 – February 23, 1893) was an American farmer and politician.

Born in Delaware County, New York, he moved to Mukwonago, Wisconsin Territory, in 1837. In 1860, Ray moved to the Town of La Grange, Walworth County, Wisconsin. He served on the Walworth County Board of Supervisors for La Grange. In 1868, Ray served in the Wisconsin State Assembly as a Republican. His brother, Adam E. Ray, also served in the Wisconsin Assembly. A nephew, Patrick Henry Ray, became a brigadier general in the United States Army. In 1870, Ray moved to Whitewater, Wisconsin, where he died in 1893.

Notes

1819 births
1893 deaths
People from Delaware County, New York
People from La Grange, Wisconsin
People from Whitewater, Wisconsin
Farmers from Wisconsin
County supervisors in Wisconsin
19th-century American politicians
People from Mukwonago, Wisconsin
Republican Party members of the Wisconsin State Assembly